The United Kingdom's National Fruit Collection is one of the largest collections of fruit trees and plants in the world.

It has been curated and maintained at Brogdale Farm, Brogdale, Kent since 1952 and is owned by the Department for Environment, Food and Rural Affairs (Defra). The University of Reading took over day-to-day maintenance of the collection in 2008.

The collection includes two trees or bushes of each variety, in case one is lost.

References

External links 

"Orchard Archives: The National Fruit Collection" by Dr Joan Morgan in Studies in the History of British Fruit, part 2 in Occasional Papers from the RHS Lindley Library, volume 7, March 2021

Botanical gardens in England
University of Reading
Government of the United Kingdom
Gardens in Kent
Orchards
1952 establishments in England